Southampton City Primary Care Trust was the NHS primary care trust (PCT) covering the city of Southampton in England.  Established in April 2001, Southampton City was the very first PCT in the country.

History
The trust was established on 1 April 2001 as an evolution of an organisation called Southampton East Healthcare, which covered part of the city as well as parts of Eastleigh.  Over the first year, the organisation's boundaries altered, and from 1 April 2002, the PCT was responsible for healthcare in the whole of Southampton, while the Eastleigh portion was transferred to Eastleigh and Test Valley Primary Care Trust (now Hampshire Primary Care Trust). Following the implementation of the Health and Social Care Act 2012, the PCT was abolished and replaced by Southampton City Clinical Commissioning Group (CCG). The CCG covers the same geographical area as the PCT, operates out of the same headquarters and retained many of the same staff.

References

Organisations based in Southampton
Defunct NHS trusts